Mount Pisgah is an unincorporated community in Clermont County, in the U.S. state of Ohio.

History
Mount Pisgah was not officially platted. The first post office was originally known as Lisbon. The Lisbon post office was established in 1837, the name was changed to Mount Pisgah in 1844, and the post office closed in 1907.

References

Unincorporated communities in Clermont County, Ohio
Unincorporated communities in Ohio